BNS Abu Bakr was a  Type 41 anti aircraft frigate of Bangladesh Navy. She served Bangladesh Navy from 1982 to 2014. The ship was named after the first Rashidun Caliph Abu Bakr.

History
The frigate was laid down by John Brown and Company, Clydebank, Scotland, on 13 August 1953, launched on 12 January 1955. She was commissioned into the Royal Navy on 14 March 1957. On 12 March 1982, she was transferred to the Bangladesh Navy.

Career
BNS Abu Bakr joined the Bangladesh Navy fleet on 12 March 1982. She served under Commodore Commanding BN Flotilla (COMBAN). About 200 personnel served aboard Abu Bakr, with most living aboard her.

In November 2008, BNS Abu Bakr  along with BNS Nirbhoy and BNS Madhumati intercepted Myanmar Navy ships at a disputed region of Bay of Bengal where they were supporting an exploration of oil and gas fields.

After serving the Bangladesh Navy for about 32 years and a total of 57 years of service life, the ship was decommissioned on 22 January 2014, and eventually scrapped. She was replaced by a Chinese Type 053H2 frigate BNS Abu Bakr (2014) with the same name and pennant number.

See also
List of historic ships of the Bangladesh Navy

References

Decommissioned ships of the Bangladesh Navy
Leopard-class frigates of the Bangladesh Navy
Ships built on the River Clyde
Leopard-class frigates
1955 ships
Frigates of the Bangladesh Navy